Jordan Chort (born March 6, 1987 in Bruges, France) is a professional footballer who plays as a full-back for Aviron Bayonnais.

He signed for Bayonnais on a free transfer on July 16, 2009.

References

External links
 
 

1987 births
Living people
People from Bruges, Gironde
Sportspeople from Gironde
Association football fullbacks
French footballers
Chamois Niortais F.C. players
FC Libourne players
Aviron Bayonnais FC players
Genêts Anglet players
Ligue 2 players
Championnat National players
Championnat National 3 players
Footballers from Nouvelle-Aquitaine